Paratriatoma is a genus of kissing bugs in the family Reduviidae.There is one described species in Paratriatoma, P. hirsuta.

References

Further reading

 
 

Reduviidae
Articles created by Qbugbot